FC Wohlen is a Swiss football club based in the town Wohlen in Canton Aargau. They play in the Swiss 1. Liga, the fourth tier of football in the country.

The club was founded in May 1904 and holds the honour of being the oldest football club in Switzerland that is not in a city. From 1930 to 1932 the team played in the Swiss Super League, the highest league in Switzerland, but mostly it has played in the 2nd or 3rd tiers. The greatest success of their recent history was their promotion to the Challenge League in 2002. In the autumn of 2004 they moved into their new stadium, Stadion Niedermatten.

The most famous former player is Ciriaco Sforza.

Current squad

Former players

Former managers

Stadium

The stadium is located in an area of Wohlen known as the "low mats". The stadium is owned by the Wohlen Council.

The total capacity is 3,734. Of these, 634 seats and 3100 standing.

The stadium is part of the a sports complex which includes, in addition to the football stadium, an athletics facility with 400-meter circular track, an inline skating space, two all-weather football pitches and nine tennis courts. The construction work began in autumn 2002 and was completed in spring 2004.

References

External links
 Official site 
 Soccerway profile 

 
Football clubs in Switzerland
Association football clubs established in 1904
1904 establishments in Switzerland